The Ministry of National Investment Plan of the Republic of Serbia was the ministry in the Government of Serbia. The ministry was merged into the Ministry of Economy and Regional Development on 14 March 2011.

History
After the dissolution of the Ministry of Foreign Economic Relations (merged into the Ministry of Economy and Regional Development), the Government of Serbia established one position - minister without portfolio who was in the charge of National Investment Plan, with Dragan Đilas as minister responsible.

The Ministry of National Investment Plan was officially established one year later, on 7 July 2008. It took some of the jurisdictions of former Ministry of Foreign Economic Relations. The Ministry later merged into the Ministry of Economy and Regional Development on 14 March 2011.

List of ministers
Political Party:

External links
 Serbian Ministry of National Investment Plan
 Serbian ministries, etc – Rulers.org

Defunct government ministries of Serbia
2007 establishments in Serbia
Ministries established in 2007
2011 disestablishments in Serbia
Ministries disestablished in 2011